Temel Kotil (born 1959 in Rize, Turkey) is an aeronautical engineer and currently the CEO of Turkish Aerospace Industries. Previously, he served as the CEO of Turkish Airlines from April 2005 to October 2016.

He graduated in Aeronautical Engineering from Istanbul Technical University with a B.Sc degree in 1983. Awarded a scholarship by the Turkish Ministry of Industry in 1984, he was educated at the University of Michigan-Ann Arbor (USA), where he obtained an M.Sc degree in Aerospace Engineering in 1986 and another M.Sc in Mechanical Engineering in 1987 from the same university. Kotil continued his studies there and received his Ph.D. in Mechanical Engineering in 1991.

After returning home in 1991, he was appointed an associate chair in the Department of Aeronautical Engineering at Istanbul Technical University. He founded and managed the laboratories of aircraft design, structural mechanics and advance computational mechanics. At the same time, Kotil was charged with duties of the manager of the department's computer center. From 1994 until 1997, he served as the manager of a technical department at Istanbul Metropolitan Municipality. Between 2002-03, he worked as the head of the Research, Planning and Coordination Department at Advance Innovative Technologies Inc. in New York. In 2003, he returned to Turkey and was employed by Turkish Airlines in Istanbul becoming its executive vice president in charge of technical affairs. In April 2005, Kotil was appointed to assume the position of the General Manager and CEO of the biggest airline company of Turkey. Kotil retired as CEO of Turkish Airlines in October 2016, being succeeded by Bilal Ekşi.

Kotil is a member of the Turkish Mechanical Engineering Society since 1991 and has been a member of the Board of Governors at the International Air Transport Association since 2006. In 2010 he was elected as a Board of Governors of Association of European Airlines (AEA) and became Vice President between the years of 2012 and 2013.  On 1 January 2014, Kotil became President of the AEA.

Awards
2014 Airline Strategy Awards - Executive Leadership Award

References

External links
 "Flying the Flag", economist.com; accessed 27 December 2014.

1959 births
People from Rize
Living people
Istanbul Technical University alumni
University of Michigan College of Engineering alumni
Academic staff of Istanbul Technical University
Turkish chief executives
Turkish Airlines
Structural engineers
Businesspeople in aviation
Turkish mechanical engineers